The West Asian Billiard and Snooker Federation abbreviated as WABSF, founded in 2010, is an association of the billiard and snooker playing nations in Western Asia. Its founding members and competing nations are 13 West Asian nations, namely Saudi Arabia, Bahrain, Iraq, Iran, Lebanon, Syria, Oman, Jordan, Palestine, Qatar, Kuwait, UAE, and Yemen.

They organize the West Asian Championship for Billiard Sports annually, alongside other occasional tournaments.

Member Associations
WABSF has 13 member associations. All of them are members of the Asian Billiard Confederation.

Competitions
WABSF runs the West Asian Billiard and Snooker Championship annually, of which these listed are the editions;

Presidents

Footnotes

Western Asia
Sports governing bodies in Asia
Snooker governing bodies